Christopher Tucker (born August 31, 1971) is an American stand-up comedian and actor. Tucker made his debut in 1992 as a stand-up performer on the HBO comedy series Def Comedy Jam, where he frequently appeared on the show during the 1990s. He appeared in the films Friday, The Fifth Element, Money Talks, and Jackie Brown, and later gained fame for playing Detective James Carter in the Rush Hour series, for which he received several accolades.

Early life and education
Christopher Tucker was born on August 31, 1971 in Atlanta, Georgia, the youngest son of Mary Louise (née Bryant) and Norris Tucker. One of six children, Tucker learned early in life that humor had the power to draw attention to himself both at school and at home. His father was an independent businessman who owned a janitorial service. Tucker grew up in Decatur, Georgia, and after graduating from Columbia High School, he moved to Los Angeles to pursue his comedy career. His comedy influences were Richard Pryor and Eddie Murphy, and Tucker was known by his teachers and high school classmates for making people laugh by doing impressions of Murphy, Michael Jackson, and others. Tucker grew up in a Pentecostal Christian household, as his parents were members of the Church of God in Christ during his childhood.

Career

Tucker began showcasing his comedy skills before an audience in local Atlanta comedy clubs until he decided to move to Los Angeles in 1990 to further pursue his stand-up comedy career. In 1992, Tucker was a frequent performer on the HBO comedy series Def Comedy Jam. He made his cinematic debut in House Party 3 in 1994 and gained greater film recognition alongside N.W.A rapper Ice Cube in Friday the following year. In 1997, he co-starred in the films The Fifth Element and Money Talks. He also played a supporting role in Quentin Tarantino's Jackie Brown and had a starring role in the spy comedy Double-O-Soul, but was never released.

Along with Hong Kong martial artist Jackie Chan, Tucker starred as LAPD detective James Carter in the martial arts action comedy film series Rush Hour. After the commercial success of the first Rush Hour film, he held out for a $20 million salary for Rush Hour 2, and was paid $25 million for Rush Hour 3. The latter was part of a $40 million two-movie contract with New Line Cinema that also included an unnamed future film. He was also to receive 20% of the gross from Rush Hour 3.

Tucker did not reprise his role as Smokey in Next Friday (2000) or Friday After Next (2002) for religious reasons, later explaining that he didn't want to encourage others to smoke weed. He starred in Michael Jackson's video "You Rock My World" and made a cameo appearance in Tupac Shakur's "California Love". On February 13, 2009, Tucker participated in the NBA All-Star Weekend's Celebrity Game. Other celebrities participating included rapper Master P, NBA Hall of Famers Clyde Drexler and Dominique Wilkins, wide receiver Terrell Owens, and four Harlem Globetrotters.

Tucker was announced in 2007 to star in the New Line drama film Mr. S: My Life with Frank Sinatra, directed by Brett Ratner and based on George Jacobs's autobiography of working as Frank Sinatra's valet during the Rat Pack era of 1953–68.

In 2011, Tucker made a comeback to stand-up comedy. The next year, he returned to film in Silver Linings Playbook, co-starring Bradley Cooper, Jennifer Lawrence, and Robert De Niro. Tucker's performance in the film was well received by critics and audiences alike. The film itself received numerous nominations and awards including the Broadcast Film Critics Association Award for Best Cast. He also hosted the 2013 BET Awards. In 2016, he appeared in Billy Lynn's Long Halftime Walk.

Personal life
Tucker has a son named Destin with his ex-wife Azja Pryor. He divides his time between Los Angeles, Las Vegas, and Atlanta. Tucker once owned a home in Montverde, Florida in the Orlando, Florida area, however it was foreclosed on in 2011.

Tucker is good friends with fellow Rush Hour co-star Jackie Chan. He was also close with singer Michael Jackson: introducing and dancing with him at his 30th Anniversary Celebration; appearing in his video "You Rock My World" from the 2001 album Invincible; and attending his memorial service. Tucker's career was also influenced by Jackson, as he is seen dancing and singing to "Don't Stop 'Til You Get Enough" in a scene in Rush Hour 2 and imitating Jackson's dancing style in Friday. He endorsed Barack Obama in the 2008 primaries.

Tucker participated in professor Henry Louis Gates Jr.'s 2006 PBS documentary on the genetic makeup of African Americans, African American Lives, that specifically focused on stories of Native American heritage in African-American communities. Tucker's DNA test results showed African, European, and "likely some Native American" ancestors. Tucker's patrilineal ancestry was also traced back to the Ambundu ethnic group of Angola and one line of his mother's to the Bamileke of Cameroon. He also traced his family tree back to the 1830s. Tucker and Gates were shown visiting Angola, the birthplace of some of his ancestors.

In 2014, Tucker settled a $2.5 million tax debt. A representative blamed "poor accounting and business management". In November 2021, the IRS sued Tucker seeking $9.6 million in back taxes.

Also in 2014, Tucker told an interviewer that he refrains from using harsh profanity in his performances due to his Christian faith.

In 2021, Tucker joined the Heal Los Angeles Foundation as an official ambassador. The Foundation is co-founded by Michael Jackson’s son, Prince Jackson, and their purpose is to help inner-city youth in Los Angeles by ending homelessness, child abuse, and hunger in the city.

During the 2022 Halloween Thriller Night hosted by the Heal Los Angeles Foundation, Tucker and Steve Harvey were honored and received the inaugural "Man in The Mirror" Award. The award is given to influential individuals using their platforms for good. Tucker accepted the award that was presented by Prince Jackson.

Filmography

Film

Television

Music videos

References

External links

1971 births
Living people
20th-century American comedians
20th-century American male actors
21st-century American comedians
21st-century American male actors
African-American Christians
African-American male actors
African-American male comedians
African-American stand-up comedians
American Christians
American male comedians
American male film actors
American male television actors
American people of Angolan descent
American people of Cameroonian descent
American people who self-identify as being of Native American descent
American stand-up comedians
Comedians from Georgia (U.S. state)
Converts to Christianity
Male actors from Atlanta
Male actors from Georgia (U.S. state)
People from Atlanta
People from Decatur, Georgia
Bamileke people